Heliophanus splendidus is a jumping spider species in the genus Heliophanus.  It was first described by Wanda Wesołowska in 2003 and has been identified in Democratic Republic of the Congo and Nigeria.

References

Spiders described in 1986
Fauna of the Democratic Republic of the Congo
Fauna of Nigeria
Salticidae
Spiders of Africa
Taxa named by Wanda Wesołowska